Tunca Bridge (aka Ekmekçizade Ahmet Paşa Köprüsü) is a historic bridge in Turkey.

It is on the road connecting Edirne to Karaağaç and spans over the Tunca River just to the north of the intersection point of Tunca and Meriç Rivers. 
It was commissioned by Ekmekçizade Ahmet Pasha who was a defterdar of the Ottoman Empire between 1606 and 1613. Its architect was probably Sedefkar Mehmet Aga who was also the architect of Sultan Ahmed Mosque in İstanbul . Its construction period was between 1608 and 1615. It is an arch bridge with 11 abutments and 10 arches. There is also a small tower in the midpoint.
Although a part of the bridge including the small tower had been damaged during the frequent floods, in 2008 it was restored.

References

Bridges in Edirne
Stone bridges in Turkey
Bridges completed in 1615
Ottoman bridges in Turkey
Arch bridges in Turkey
Bridges over the Tunca
Road bridges in Turkey
1615 establishments in the Ottoman Empire